Melton was a county constituency centred on the town of Melton Mowbray in Leicestershire.  It returned one Member of Parliament (MP)  to the House of Commons of the Parliament of the United Kingdom.

The constituency was created for the 1885 general election, when the former two-seat Northern Division of Leicestershire was replaced by two new single-seat county divisions: Melton and Loughborough. It was abolished for the 1983 general election, when it was succeeded by the Rutland and Melton constituency.

Boundaries 
1885–1918: The Sessional Divisions of Belvoir and Melton Mowbray, and parts of the Sessional Divisions of Leicester and Loughborough.

1918–1950: The Urban Districts of Melton Mowbray, Quorndon, and Thurmaston, and the Rural Districts of Barrow-upon-Soar, Belvoir, Billesdon, and Melton Mowbray.

1950–1974: The Urban District of Melton Mowbray, and the Rural Districts of Barrow-upon-Soar, Billesdon, and Melton and Belvoir.

1974–1983: The Urban District of Melton Mowbray, and the Rural Districts of Barrow-upon-Soar, and Melton and Belvoir.

As its name suggested, the main settlement in the constituency was Melton Mowbray.

Members of Parliament

Elections

Elections in the 1880s 

Manners was appointed Chancellor of the Duchy of Lancaster, requiring a by-election.

Manners succeeded to the peerage, becoming Duke of Rutland, causing a by-election.

Elections in the 1890s

Elections in the 1900s

Elections in the 1910s 

General Election 1914–15:

Another General Election was required to take place before the end of 1915. The political parties had been making preparations for an election to take place and by July 1914, the following candidates had been selected; 
Unionist: Charles Yate
Liberal: Arthur Richardson

Elections in the 1920s

Elections in the 1930s 

Liberal candidate Guy Halford Dixon withdrew at the start of the campaign

General Election 1939–40:
Another General Election was required to take place before the end of 1940. The political parties had been making preparations for an election to take place and by the Autumn of 1939, the following candidates had been selected; 
Conservative: Lindsay Everard
Labour: Clare Hollingworth
Liberal: J. T. Pepper

Elections in the 1940s

Elections in the 1950s

Elections in the 1960s

Elections in the 1970s

References 

Parliamentary constituencies in Leicestershire (historic)
Constituencies of the Parliament of the United Kingdom established in 1885
Constituencies of the Parliament of the United Kingdom disestablished in 1983